The Shadow of Your Smile is an album by American pop singer Johnny Mathis that was released by Mercury Records in March 1966, and included covers of the same two Beatles songs ("Michelle" and "Yesterday") that would be in stores one month later on an  Andy Williams album of the same name. Mathis also tackled recent easy listening fare on this album ("A Taste of Honey", "Quiet Nights of Quiet Stars (Corcovado)") in addition to show tunes from On a Clear Day You Can See Forever and West Side Story.

The first single from the album, "On a Clear Day You Can See Forever", debuted on Billboard magazine's list of the 40 most popular Easy Listening songs in the US a few months before the album's release, in the issue dated November 6, 1965, and made it to number 6 during a 15-week chart run. In the meantime it also spent two weeks on [[Billboard Hot 100|Billboard'''s Hot 100]] that began in the December 18 issue and included a peak position at number 98. The Shadow of Your Smile had its first appearance on the magazine's Top LP's chart in the issue dated April 2, 1966, and began a run of 45 weeks there, where it got as high as number nine. This was the most weeks that an album of his stayed on their list since Johnny's Mood in 1960 and the highest chart position an album of his achieved since 1960's The Rhythms and Ballads of Broadway.The Shadow of Your Smile was released for the first time on compact disc on November 6, 2012, as one of two albums on one CD, the second of the two being his previous LP, The Sweetheart Tree. Both were also included in Sony's Mathis box set The Complete Global Albums Collection, which was released on November 17, 2014.

History
Mathis and fellow easy listening singers like Williams began to succumb to the effects of the British Invasion by early 1966. "The Beatles had ushered in the era of the performer-songwriter; therefore, good songs just weren’t getting past the artists who were recording them for their own releases. The result was a steady emergence of what in the industry became known as the 'cover album', upon which songs that had achieved a certain level of popularity were recorded or 'covered' by a number of artists and savored by their loyal fans." Two of the Fab Four's quieter numbers, "Michelle" and "Yesterday", were understandable choices to present to the Mathis audience, but he recalled that it was still not an easy fit. "'I wasn't quite sure how to go about it because their recordings were so minimalist as far as orchestrations and sounded perfect when they did it, but I found it difficult to repeat. But I did get the chance to sing on "Michelle" with John Pisano, who is a great, great guitarist and a wonderfully nice man.'"

It was the Mancini-Mercer tune "Moment to Moment", however, that stayed in the Mathis repertoire through the decades and even was performed for a phone-in fan on the A&E Network's 1998 Mathis concert Live by Request. In 2012 Mathis said, "'I used to perform it constantly, but now by the time I get to the end and some of those high notes, I can hardly pull it off anymore.'"

ReceptionBillboard proclaimed, "Another superb Mathis performance to delight his multitude of followers," and upon the album's CD release Stephen Thomas Erlewine of Allmusic wrote, "Not only is The Shadow of Your Smile one of Mathis's most popular records, it's one of his strongest."

Track listing

Side one
"Moment to Moment" from Moment to Moment (Henry Mancini, Johnny Mercer) – 2:23
"The Shadow of Your Smile" from The Sandpiper (Johnny Mandel, Paul Francis Webster) – 3:03
"Michelle" (John Lennon, Paul McCartney) – 2:33
"Yesterday" (Lennon, McCartney) – 3:04
"Something's Coming" from West Side Story  (Leonard Bernstein, Stephen Sondheim) – 2:50
"A Taste of Honey" (Rick Marlow, Bobby Scott) – 3:09

Side two
"I'm in Love for the Very First Time" from An Alligator Named Daisy (Paddy Roberts, Jack Woodman) – 3:15
"Quiet Nights of Quiet Stars (Corcovado)" (Antonio Carlos Jobim, Gene Lees) – 2:26
"I Left My Heart in San Francisco" (George Cory, Douglass Cross) – 2:59
"On a Clear Day (You Can See Forever)" from On a Clear Day You Can See Forever (Alan Jay Lerner, Burton Lane) – 2:43
"Melinda" from On a Clear Day You Can See Forever (Lerner, Lane) – 3:18
"Come Back to Me" from On a Clear Day You Can See Forever (Lerner, Lane) – 2:16

Recording dates
From the liner notes for The Complete Global Albums Collection:

August 27, 1965: "Come Back to Me", "On a Clear Day You Can See Forever"
September 14, 1965: "Melinda"
January 12, 1966: "Michelle", "Moment to Moment", "The Shadow of Your Smile", "A Taste of Honey"
January 13, 1966: "I Left My Heart in San Francisco", "I'm in Love for the Very First Time", "Quiet Nights of Quiet Stars (Corcovado)", "Something's Coming", "Yesterday"

Personnel

Johnny Mathis – vocals; liner notes
Don Rieber – producer
Jack Elliott – arranger, conductor ("Moment to Moment", "The Shadow of Your Smile")
Bryan Fahey – conductor ("Something's Coming")
Tony Osborne – arranger, conductor ("I Left My Heart in San Francisco", "I'm in Love for the Very First Time"); arranger ("Something's Coming")
Glenn Osser – arranger, conductor ("Come Back to Me", "Melinda", "On a Clear Day You Can See Forever", "Quiet Nights of Quiet Stars (Corcovado)", "Yesterday")
John Pisano – arranger, conductor ("Michelle", "A Taste of Honey")
There were no production credits on the original album jacket, but Rieber is credited as producer in the liner notes of both its CD debut and The Complete Global Albums Collection''.

References

Bibliography

 

1966 albums
Johnny Mathis albums
Mercury Records albums
Albums arranged by Glenn Osser
Albums conducted by Glenn Osser